Stefan Kaufmann (born 21 August 1969 in Stuttgart) is a German politician of the Christian Democratic Union (CDU) who has been serving as a member of the German Bundestag from 2009 to October 2021.

Earlier life
Kaufmann was born as the youngest of three brothers to a family living in Stuttgart-Weilimdorf. His father, a confidential clerk, died in 1982. He received his Abitur in 1989 at the Solitude-Gymnasium and served during his Zivildienst at the Diakonisches Werk Württemberg. He attended university in Tübingen, majoring in Legal science, including a year at Leiden University. Afterwards, he worked as a scientific assistant at the University of Hohenheim. Kaufmann had a Konrad Adenauer Foundation scholarship since before he graduated from university and became a Doctor of law in 2001. He is a member of Phi Delta Phi.

Early career
In 1992, Kaufmann founded the "Forum für Hochschul- und Bildungspolitik Tübingen e.V“ (Forum for Hochschul- and Education Politics Tübingen e.V) in Tübingen. This association's task was developing a general concept for educational politics that particularly targeted the contact points between the respective institutions. For his work in relation to this, he received an award from the Ministry of Science, Research and Arts of Baden-Württemberg.

From 1995 until 1998, Kaufmann was assistant to Doris Pack, CDU, then Speaker in Matters of Educational Politics for the EPP at the European Parliament. Later, he was assistant and speechwriter for MEP Renate Heinisch, also CDU.

Political career
Kaufmann joined the CDU in 1999. Between March 2001 and October 2009, he was a Speaker for the Party in the district advisory council of Stuttgart-Sillenbuch, since April 2003 he has been chairman of the local group of the CDU in "Stuttgart-Sillenbuch-Heumaden-Riedenberg".

In November 2005 he was elected secondary candidate for the Landtag in the Stuttgart I electoral district, and one year later he was elected member of the District Board of the CDU.

In 2008, the CDU in Stuttgart appointed him candidate for the Bundestag, again in Stuttgart I, after his predecessor on this appointment had died. In October of the same year he was elected Deputy District Chairman of the CDU in Stuttgart.

Member of the Bundestag, 2009–present
In the 2009 German federal election, Kaufmann won the direct mandate in Stuttgart I over the Federal Chairman of the Bündnis 90/Die Grünen, Cem Özdemir, and hence became MdB (Member of the Bundestag). In his campaign, he also campaigned in local hotspots of the homosexual scene and on Christopher Street Day. At the same time being a devoted catholic, he also criticized the comparison with Nazism the Society of St. Pius X published on the occasion of the Christopher Street Day in 2007.

In parliament, Kaufmann is a member of the Committee of Education, Research and Technological Impact Assessment. He also serves as deputy member of the Budget Committee, after previously having been a deputy member of the Committee on Petitions and the Committee of Traffic, Construction and Urban Development.

In the negotiations to form a fourth coalition government under Chancellor Angela Merkel following the 2017 federal elections, Kaufmann was part of the working group on education policy, led by Annegret Kramp-Karrenbauer, Stefan Müller and Hubertus Heil.

Other activities
 Helmholtz Association of German Research Centres, Ex-Officio Member of the Senate
 Leibniz Association, Member of the Senate (since 2018)
 German National Association for Student Affairs, Ex-Officio Member of the Board of Trustees
 Magnus Hirschfeld Foundation, Member of the Board of Trustees
 Max Planck Institute for Solid State Research, Member of the Board of Trustees
 Jugend gegen AIDS, Member of the Advisory Board
 Phi Delta Phi – Richard von Weizsäcker Inn Tübingen, Honorary Member

Political positions
In 2019, Kaufmann joined 14 members of his parliamentary group who, in an open letter, called for the party to rally around Merkel and party chairwoman Annegret Kramp-Karrenbauer amid criticism voiced by conservatives Friedrich Merz and Roland Koch.

Personal life
Kaufmann is openly gay.

In June 2010, Kaufmann was involved in a planecrash when a historical DC-3 he was riding in crashlanded shortly after take-off.

Publication
Das Europäische Hochschulinstitut: Die Florentiner Europa-Universität im Gefüge des europäischen und internationalen Rechts, (Tübinger Schriften zum internationalen und europäischen Recht 61; Berlin : Duncker & Humblot, 2003),

References

External links
 

1969 births
Living people
Politicians from Stuttgart
German Roman Catholics
Members of the Bundestag for Baden-Württemberg
University of Tübingen alumni
Gay politicians
LGBT conservatism
LGBT members of the Bundestag
LGBT Roman Catholics
Members of the Bundestag 2017–2021
Members of the Bundestag 2013–2017
Members of the Bundestag 2009–2013
Members of the Bundestag for the Christian Democratic Union of Germany